Teysachaux (1,909 m) is a mountain of the Swiss Prealps, overlooking Les Paccots in the canton of Fribourg.

Toponymy 

In patois, Teysachaux is the contraction of taiza ("spread") and chaux ("meadow").

Geography 

Teysachaux lies at the south end of the Moléson ridge, west of the Sarine river valley. Nearby summits include Niremont on the west side and Dent de Lys on the south side.

Several chalets (some of them have been converted into small restaurants) can be found on Teysachaux's slopes. They have been built during the 18th and 19th century, showing the evidence of a progressive expansion of farming (mainly milk and cheese) towards higher meadows.

History 

In 1870, on the foothills of the west side of Teysachaux, a 2-meters long fossilised ichthyosaurus has been discovered. It dates from the Jurassic period (175 to 183 million years), when dinosaurs walked the Earth. This fossil is now part of the permanent exhibition at the Museum of Natural History of Fribourg

See also 
 Moléson
 Les Paccots

References

External links
 Teysachaux on Hikr
 Gruyère-Moléson tourism office
 Les Paccots and Region tourism office

Mountains of Switzerland
Mountains of the Alps
Mountains of the canton of Fribourg
One-thousanders of Switzerland